Mircea Roger (born 16 June 1947) is a retired Romanian rowing coxswain. He was the youngest Romanian participant at the 1960 Summer Olympics, where he competed in the coxed pairs and coxed fours and placed sixth in the pairs.

References

1947 births
Living people
Romanian male rowers
Coxswains (rowing)
Olympic rowers of Romania
Rowers at the 1960 Summer Olympics
Sportspeople from Suceava